The 1993–94 Slovak Cup was the 25th season of Slovakia's annual knock-out cup competition and the first ever since the independence of Slovakia. It was ended on 7 June 1994 with the Final. The winners of the competition earned a place in the qualifying round of the UEFA Cup Winners' Cup. 1. FC Košice were the defending champions (the last winner of the cup in Czechoslovak era).

First round

|}

Source:

Second round

|}

Source:

Third round

|}

Sources: ,

Quarter-finals

|}

Source:

Semi-finals

|}

Final

References

External links
profutbal.sk 
Results on RSSSF

Slovak Cup seasons
Slovak Cup
Cup